Acacia torticarpa is a shrub of the genus Acacia and the subgenus Plurinerves that is endemic to a small area in western Australia.

Description
Like most species of Acacia it has phyllodes rather than true leaves. It is thought to bloom in July when it produces simple inflorescences that occur in pairs in the axils with spherical flower-heads that have a  diameter and containing 17 to 18 yellow flowers.

Taxonomy
It was first formally described by the botanists Richard Sumner Cowan and Bruce Maslin in 1990 as a part of the work Acacia Miscellany. Some new microneurous taxa of Western Australia related to A. multineata (Leguminosae: Mimosoideae: Section Plurinerves) from Western Australia as published in the journal Nuytsia. It was reclassified as Racosperma torticarpum by Leslie Pedley in 2003 then transferred back to genus Acacia in 2006. It is similar in appearance to Acacia caesariata.

Distribution
It is native to an area in the Wheatbelt region of Western Australia. It has a limited and disjunct distribution nd is only known from two populations near Yorkrakine and about  further south around South Kumminin.

See also
 List of Acacia species

References

torticarpa
Acacias of Western Australia
Taxa named by Bruce Maslin
Taxa named by Richard Sumner Cowan
Plants described in 1990